Border Flight is a 1936 American aviation drama film directed by Otho Lovering and written by Stuart Anthony, Arthur J. Beckhard and Ewing Scott. The film stars Frances Farmer, John Howard, Roscoe Karns, Robert Cummings, Grant Withers and Samuel S. Hinds. Border flight was based on the exploits of the US Coast Guard pilots, based in San Diego. In Aviation in the Cinema (1985), aviation film historian Stephen Pendo considered Border Flight, a drama that "detailed the aerial activities of  the United States Coast Guard fighting a gang of smugglers."

Plot
Lieutenant Pat Tornell (Grant Withers) and Lieutenant Bob Dixon (Robert Cummings) are sworn into the United States Coast Guard Air Patrol, West Coast division. Pat hates to follow rules, but works with his former rival from school, Lieutenant Dan Conlon (John Howard). Pat starts flirting with Dan's beautiful girlfriend, Anne Blane (Frances Farmer).

Former ace pilot Calico Smith (Roscoe Karns), intervenes between Pat and Dan. When Commander Moseley (Samuel S. Hinds) is criticized for having allowed fur smugglers elude the Coast Guard, he sends his men out to bring the smugglers in. Dixon is shot in the attempt, and goes down with his aircraft.

The Coast Guard then arms their aircraft with machine guns. During gunnery practise, Pat flies dangerously. Reprimanded by Moseley, who warns both men to end their rivalry, but Pat doesn't listen. On another patrol, Dan is able to shoot down a smuggler's aircraft. On the day that Anne is expected to return from a short trip, Pat as officer of the day, tells Dan that he can leave his post early. The real reason for this gesture is that Pat leaves a welcome home message in the sky to Anne over her ship

When Pat buzzes the ship, the captain calla Moseley to complain. Pat's antics finally force to asks for Pat's resignation. Pat quits and begins flying for the smugglers while continuing to pursue Anne, who believes that he is actually working undercover for the Coast Guard. Pat and Anne are kidnapped by the smugglers who take them to their hideout.

Anne, whom Dan has taught to use a short-wave radio, manages to get loose from her restraints and calls Dan, alerting him to their location. Dan flies out to rescue her, and Calico follows, determined to help. When Dan arrives, the smugglers are on a boat off the beach, and fire upon him, wounding him in the leg and blowing up his aircraft.

Dan tells Pat and Anne to escape in Pat's plane, but Anne vows to stay by Dan, while Pat takes off. Pat realizes that he can still make everyone proud. After sending a farewell message to Anne, he crashes into the smugglers' ship, destroying the ship, the smugglers, his aircraft and himself.

Cast

Frances Farmer as Anne Blane
John Howard as Lt. Dan Conlon
Roscoe Karns as Calico Smith
Robert Cummings as Lt. Bob Dixon
Grant Withers as Lt. Pat Tornell
Samuel S. Hinds as Commander Mosely
Donald Kirke as Heming
Matty Fain as Jerry
Frank Faylen as Jimmie
Ted Oliver as Turk
Paul Barrett as Radio Operator

Production
The aircraft used in Border Flight included Stearman C3R, Curtiss Fledgling c / n 69, NC465K and a Lockheed Vega 5C c / n 171, NC965Y. Principal photography took place at Burbank's United Air Terminal, where Paul Mantz's company, United Air Services, was based.

Filming started February 1936. It lasted four weeks. Although not listed in the credits, Mantz and Frank Clarke, his collaborator and competitor, did the flying in Border Flight.

Robert Cummings was a gifted pilot, having had his first flights in 1927 as a teenager. Flying both privately and as a commercial pilot, Cummings enrolled at Carnegie Tech in Pittsburgh, Pennsylvania for courses in mechanical engineering with the goal of a degree in aeronautics. The 1929 Wall Street Crash ended that effort, but he continued to fly throughout his life. During World War II, Cummings helped organize California’s first Civil Air Patrol, which he later commanded. He became a flight instructor in the U.S. Army Air Force. Many of his later films and television work featured aviation.

Reception
Border Flight was released on May 29, 1936, by Paramount Pictures. Frank Nugent, film reviewer at The New York Times, criticized the plot as formulaic.

Aviation film historian James M. Farmer in Celluloid Wings: The Impact of Movies on Aviation (1984), had a similar reaction, saying that Border Flight was "... (a) routine" melodrama.

References

Notes

Citations

Bibliography

 Farmer, James H. Celluloid Wings: The Impact of Movies on Aviation. Blue Ridge Summit, Pennsylvania: Tab Books Inc., 1984. .
 Orriss, Bruce W. When Hollywood Ruled the Skies: The Years Between the Wars 1920–1941. Los Angeles: Aero Associates, 2015. .
 Pendo, Stephen. Aviation in the Cinema. Lanham, Maryland: Scarecrow Press, 1985. .

External links
 
 

1936 films
American aviation films
American black-and-white films
Films about the United States Coast Guard
Films directed by Otho Lovering
Paramount Pictures films
American drama films
1936 drama films
1930s English-language films
1930s American films